Bass 305 is a Miami bass group founded by brothers David and Mark Watson. Bass 305's first release was in 1992 on their own independent label, DM Records. The group was active as of 2021, producing 12 studio albums.

Discography

Studio albums

Singles

References

American electronic music duos
American electro musicians
Miami bass groups
Hip hop duos
Musical groups established in 1992
1992 establishments in Florida